Andrey Amador Bikkazakova (born 29 August 1986) is a Costa Rican professional road bicycle racer, who currently rides for UCI WorldTeam .

Career

Amador is the son of Rodolfo Amador, a Costa Rican and Raisa Bikkazakova, a Russian immigrant who arrived in the country after meeting and marrying Amador's father. He is the youngest of three brothers. He started cycling professionally at the age of 20 in 2006, but started cycling at a very early age. Amador was selected to carry the flag for Costa Rica at the 2011 Pan American Games opening ceremony. He is the first Costa Rican to ever ride the Tour de France. In 2012, Amador won a mountainous stage 14 in the Giro d'Italia after breaking away from the group during the final descent right before the final climb. Though he was caught right at the finish of the climb he won the sprint in the end. In 2013, he finished 8th overall in the Tirreno-Adriatico.

In the 2016 Giro d'Italia, Amador held the pink jersey after stage 13. He became the first Costa Rican to lead a Grand Tour.

Amador signed a three-year deal with  the following day, with his first race start scheduled to come at the UAE Tour in the final week of February.

Major results

2005
 5th Overall Vuelta Ciclista a Costa Rica
2006
 2nd Time trial, National Under-23 Road Championships
2007
 1st Stage 5 Vuelta a Navarra
2008
 1st Vuelta al Bidasoa
 5th Overall Tour de l'Avenir
1st Prologue
 8th Overall Vuelta a Navarra
2010
 10th Vuelta a La Rioja
2011
 4th Vuelta a La Rioja
 4th Gran Premio de Llodio
2012
 1st Stage 14 Giro d'Italia
 4th Prueba Villafranca de Ordizia
 9th Overall Tour de San Luis
 10th Overall Tour Méditerranéen
2013
 8th Overall Tirreno–Adriatico
 10th Gent–Wevelgem
2014
 1st Stage 1 (TTT) Vuelta a España
 6th Overall Tour de Pologne
 10th Overall Tour du Haut Var
2015
 3rd  Team time trial, UCI Road World Championships
 4th Overall Giro d'Italia
2016
 8th Overall Giro d'Italia
Held  after Stage 13
2017
 5th Trofeo Serra de Tramuntana
2018
 1st Klasika Primavera
 9th Overall Vuelta a Andalucía
2019
 2nd Trofeo Matteotti
 8th Overall Tour of Britain

Grand Tour general classification results timeline

References

External links 

Profile at Movistar Team website

1986 births
Living people
Costa Rican people of Russian descent
Costa Rican people of Spanish descent
Sportspeople from San José, Costa Rica
Costa Rican male cyclists
Cyclists at the 2012 Summer Olympics
Cyclists at the 2016 Summer Olympics
Cyclists at the 2020 Summer Olympics
Olympic cyclists of Costa Rica
Costa Rican Giro d'Italia stage winners
People from Alajuela